Splash News is an entertainment news agency. The company provides candid celebrity photography and video content for entertainment to print online, and broadcast to media outlets.

Founded in 1990, Splash News has a global network of contributors and has offices in London, New York, Los Angeles, Miami and Berlin.

History 
In 2011, Corbis, the digital image company owned by Bill Gates, and formally known as the Branded Entertainment Network, acquired Splash News for an undisclosed amount. In 2016, Branded Entertainment Network sold Splash News to UK Company SilverHub Media. In 2022, the company was acquired by Shutterstock.

Business 
Splash News has been credited with several celebrity stories. Some well-known examples include the first images of Michael Jackson's first child, Tiger Woods' mistress, Sandra Bullock's first public appearance with her newly adopted son, and Anna Nicole Smith's death in 2007. Splash also provided coverage of the 2010 Copiapo Mining Accident in Chile.

References

1990 establishments in California
2011 mergers and acquisitions
2016 mergers and acquisitions
American companies established in 1990
Mass media companies established in 1990
News agencies based in the United States
Photo archives in the United States
Stock photography